The 2010 Michigan State Spartans football team competed on behalf of Michigan State University in the Big Ten Conference during the 2010 NCAA Division I FBS football season. Head coach Mark Dantonio was in his fourth season with the Spartans. Michigan State played their home games in Spartan Stadium in East Lansing, Michigan.

In the hours following the Spartans' September 18, 2010 victory over Notre Dame, Dantonio suffered a heart attack for which he was hospitalized, and received a coronary stent.  His recovery was complicated by the subsequent development of a blood clot in his leg.  While he recovered, offensive coordinator Don Treadwell stepped in as acting head coach, leading the Spartans against Northern Colorado and Wisconsin.  Dantonio resumed his head coaching duties for the sixth game of the season against Michigan, although he coached that game and the next week's game against Illinois from the press box instead of the head coach's traditional place on the sidelines.  He returned to the sidelines for MSU's road win against Northwestern.

The Spartans finished the regular season with eleven wins (tied the most to date in school history), one loss, and secured their first share of the Big Ten Championship in twenty years.

Previous season

Roster

Coaching staff
Mark Dantonio – Head Coach
Don Treadwell – Offensive Coordinator/Wide Receivers coach
Dave Warner – Quarterbacks coach
Brad Salem – Running backs coach
Mark Staten – Tight ends coach/Tackles/Recruiting Coordinator
Dan Roushar – Offensive line coach
Pat Narduzzi – Defensive Coordinator
Ted Gill – Defensive line coach
Mike Tressel – Linebackers coach/Special Teams Coordinator
Harlon Barnett – Secondary coach

Schedule

Game summaries

Western Michigan

The Spartans rushing attack was the theme of the day. To open up the scoring, Edwin Baker scampered for 28 yards for a TD. WMU responded with 1-yd TD pass from Alex Carder to Juan Nunez on 4th down. The Spartans would strike early in the 2nd quarter when QB Kirk Cousins hit QB turned WR Keith Nichol on a 20-yd TD pass.

Both offenses then struggled until late in the 2nd quarter when true freshmen Le'Veon Bell broke a 75-yd run. The drive ended with a 7-yd Edwin Baker TD run and the following Spartan drive ended with a 2-yd TD run by Le'Veon Bell. MSU drove down the field at the beginning of the 3rd quarter which ended with an 18-yd TD run by Le'Veon Bell.

WMU would score once more with 2-yd touchdown reception Blake Hammond and that would be it offensively for the Broncos. The Spartans would add a field goal by Dan Conroy and walk away with a season opening win.
Le'Veon Bell became the first freshman running back at Michigan State to rush for more than 100 yards in his opening game. He finished with 141 yards on 10 carries and 2 TD's. Edwin Baker also had over 100 yards with 117 yards on 17 carries with 2 TD's.

Florida Atlantic

Notre Dame

The 2010 rendition of the Battle for the Megaphone Trophy proved to be one of the most memorable in the series, as Michigan State beat Notre Dame 34–31 in overtime.

The Fighting Irish were the first to score, with quarterback Dayne Crist completing a seven-yard touchdown pass to Michael Floyd in the first quarter. After multiple drives ending in turnovers for both teams, the Spartans got on the board with 2:22 left in the first half via a six-yard touchdown pass from Kirk Cousins to Keshawn Martin. The score was 7–7 at the half. Michigan State received the kick-off in the second half, and on their second play from scrimmage, running back Edwin Baker scored a 56-yard touchdown run. Notre Dame's next possession also ended in a touchdown, with a 10-yard touchdown pass from Dayne Crist to tight end Kyle Rudolph. The Spartans and Irish once again traded touchdowns on the next two drives, with Michigan State's Le'Veon Bell scoring a 16-yard touchdown run, followed by Notre Dame scoring via a 15-yard pass from Crist to Theo Riddick, after which the score was 21–21 at the end of the third quarter. Early in the fourth quarter, Dayne Crist completed another touchdown pass for the Irish, this time from 24 yards out, complete to Michael Floyd. The Spartans tied the game with 7:43 left in the game with a 24-yard touchdown pass from Kirk Cousins to B.J. Cunningham. Both teams failed to move the ball for the remainder of the game, and the game was sent to overtime.

In overtime, Notre Dame received the ball first and kicked a 33-yard field goal on 4th and 1. On the Spartans' following possession, Kirk Cousins was sacked on 3rd and 5 for a loss of 9 yards, and the Spartans appeared to line up for a 46-yard field goal attempt to send the game to a second overtime. Instead, kick holder and punter Aaron Bates stood up to pass, and threw downfield to a wide open Charlie Gantt for the game-winning touchdown. Head coach Mark Dantonio divulged after the game that the play was called "Little Giants":

After the game, Mark Dantonio suffered a mild heart attack and was hospitalized. He had surgery and had a stent put in to relieve a blocked blood vessel leading to the heart. Offensive coordinator Don Treadwill was named acting head coach as Dantonio recovered.

Northern Colorado

Wisconsin

With Coach Dantonio out for a second week following his heart attack, Michigan State hosted eventual co-champs Wisconsin at Spartan Stadium in the conference opener. MSU rolled up 444 yards of offense on the Badgers in a 34–24 win. The Spartans took the lead for good with 8:11 left in the 2nd quarter when Keshawn Martin returned a punt 74 yards for a TD. A clock-draining 15-play TD drive late in the 4th quarter put MSU up by 10 and set the tone for the rest of the Big Ten season.

Michigan

In week 6, Michigan hosted their in-state rivals the Michigan State Spartans for the coveted Paul Bunyan Trophy. This year's meeting marked the 103rd game between the two schools. This was only the second time in the history of the rivalry that both teams enter the game undefeated. The last time was in 1999 when MSU beat Michigan 34–31 in East Lansing. The only score of the first quarter was Michigan's 34-yard field goal. In the second quarter, Michigan State responded with a 61-yard rushing touchdown by Edwin Baker. Michigan briefly took the lead minutes later with a 12-yard catch by Martell Webb. The Spartans responded with a 41-yard run by Le'Veon Bell to take the lead for good. They added to their lead with a 38-yard field goal by Dan Conroy just before halftime. MSU built on their lead in the third quarter with 2 touchdowns: first a 41-yard catch by Mark Dell, and then an 8-yard rush by Larry Caper. Michigan's only points of the second half came on a 4-yard rushing TD by Denard Robinson. Michigan State capped their win with a 28-yard field goal midway through the fourth. Denard Robinson threw three interceptions and was held to only 84 yards rushing.

With this win, Michigan State has defeated Michigan three years in a row, the first time that Michigan State has accomplished that since 1965–67.

Illinois

Michigan State came back from a 3–6 deficit while not allowing any second half points to defeat the Illini by 20 points and advance to 7–0 for the first time since 1966, the year they won the national championship.

Northwestern

The Spartans found themselves down 17–0 late in the first half, before Kirk Cousins found Mark Dell for a touchdown with 2:34 to go in the second quarter to make it a 17–7 game at halftime.  With a ten-point deficit early in the fourth quarter, the Spartans were situated with a 4th and 6 at the Northwestern 30 yd line, but out of field goal range because of a heavy wind.  After calling a timeout and taking a delay of game, MSU went out in punt formation.  After punter Aaron Bates received the snap, he faked the punt and threw a 15 yd pass to Bennie Fowler for a first down.  During the post game interview, Coach Dantonio was asked about the play, when he replied "That's called Mousetrap, and we let 'em take the cheese." The Spartans scored on a Kirk Cousins pass on the next play to make it 24–21. After a Northwestern field goal, the Spartans drove 88 yards in five minutes to take the lead 28–27.  The Wildcats went four and out on their next possession, but had another chance to tie the game after Edwin Baker ran for a 25 yd touchdown with a minute left to make it 35–27.  However, Michigan State's  Eric Gordon intercepted the ball two plays later to ice the game.

Iowa

Minnesota

Purdue

The Spartans overcame a 15-point deficit to secure their first 7 win undefeated home season.

Penn State

The Spartans secured a share of the Big Ten title, their first conference championship since 1990.

Alabama (Capital One Bowl)

Rankings

2011 NFL Draft
The following players were selected in the 2011 NFL Draft.

References

Michigan State
Michigan State Spartans football seasons
Big Ten Conference football champion seasons
Michigan State Spartans football